The 2018 FIBA U18 Women's European Championship was an international basketball competition that was held from 4 to 12 August 2018 in Udine, Italy. It was the 35th edition of the FIBA U18 Women's European Championship. 16 national teams from across Europe, composed of women aged 18 and under, competed in the tournament.

Venues

Participating teams
 
 
 
 
 
   (Winners, 2017 FIBA U18 Women's European Championship Division B)
 
   (Runners-up, 2017 FIBA U18 Women's European Championship Division B)
  (Host)
  
   (Third place, 2017 FIBA U18 Women's European Championship Division B)

First round
The first-round groups draw took place on 16 January 2018 in Freising, Germany.

All times are local (UTC+2).

Group A

Group B

Group C

Group D

Playoff round

Championship bracket

5th place bracket

9th place bracket

13th place bracket

Final standings

Awards

All-Tournament Team 
  Aleksa Gulbe
  María Pendande
  Leonie Fiebich
  Nyara Sabally
  Barbara Angyal

Fair Play Award 
  Jelena Mitrović

References

External links
FIBA official website

2018
2018–19 in European women's basketball
2018–19 in Italian basketball
International youth basketball competitions hosted by Italy
International women's basketball competitions hosted by Italy
Sport in Udine
2018 in youth sport
FIBA